Gabrielle Houbre is a French historian.  She is a lecturer at the University of Paris VII: Denis Diderot and a member of the Institut Universitaire de France. Specializing in 19th century history, she pursues research of gender, history of sexuality, the body, sensitivities, and youth.

After her doctoral thesis was completed under the direction of Michelle Perrot (Paris VII, 1990), she supported her accreditation in 2002 to carry out research (Les lois du genre. Identités, pratiques, représentations sociales et culturelles. France, XIXe siècle, Paris I-Sorbonne, dir. Alain Corbin).

Works 
 La Discipline de l'amour. L'éducation sentimentale des filles et des garçons à l'âge du romantisme, Plon, 1997
 Histoire de la grandeur et de la décadence de Marie Isabelle, modiste, dresseuse de chevaux, femme d'affaires, etc., Perrin, 2003
 Le Temps des jeunes filles (direction), n° 4, Clio. Femmes, genre, histoire, PUM, 1996
 Femmes et images (codirection),  n° 19, CLIO, Histoire, Femmes et Sociétés, PUM, 2004
 Le Corps des jeunes filles, de l'Antiquité à nos jours, Perrin, 2001
 Femmes, dots et patrimoines, n° 7, CLIO, Histoire, Femmes et Sociétés, PUM, 1998

Notes and references

French women historians
Gender studies academics
University of Paris alumni
Year of birth missing (living people)
Living people
21st-century French historians